Diane Guerrero (born July 21, 1986) is an American actress. She is known for her roles as inmate Maritza Ramos on the Netflix series Orange Is the New Black and Lina on Jane the Virgin. Guerrero grew up in Boston and remained there after the rest of her family was deported to Colombia. She is an advocate for immigration reform. Her role on Orange Is the New Black has contributed to three consecutive wins for the Screen Actors Guild Award for Outstanding Performance by an Ensemble in a Comedy Series. Guerrero is the author of In the Country We Love: My Family Divided, a memoir about her parents being detained and deported when she was fourteen. She currently stars as Jane in the HBO Max action-drama series Doom Patrol. She also voiced the character Isabela Madrigal in the 2021 Disney movie Encanto.

Early life
Guerrero was born in Passaic, New Jersey, to Colombian parents and raised in Boston, Massachusetts. As the only member of her immediate family with American citizenship, she chose to remain in the U.S. at the age of 14 when her parents and older brother were deported back to Colombia after unsuccessfully pursuing legal citizenship. Guerrero has since become a strong advocate for immigration reform.

Guerrero was raised in the Jamaica Plain and Roxbury neighborhoods of Boston after being taken in by other Colombian families. She attended Boston Arts Academy, a performing arts high school, where she was in the music department. Among her high school activities was singing with a jazz group, but she anticipated pursuing political science and communications in college. Her first job after college was in a law office.

In 2010, at age 24, Guerrero decided to pursue a career in acting. That same year, she appeared in the music video for Boston-based R&B singer Louie Bello's song "Faces". In 2011, she moved to New York City and studied acting at the Susan Batson Studios, where she met her manager Josh Taylor.

Career
In 2012, Guerrero was cast in Orange is the New Black in the role of Maritza Ramos, a Bronx-bred character with Colombian roots. For season 2, she was part of the cast that earned recognition for Outstanding Performance by an Ensemble in a Comedy Series at the 21st Screen Actors Guild Awards. The cast earned recognition for Outstanding Performance by an Ensemble in a Comedy Series again at the 22nd Screen Actors Guild Awards and 23rd Screen Actors Guild Awards. She remained part of the show through season 5. She returned for the final season in 2019.

In 2014, Guerrero was cast in a recurring role on The CW series Jane the Virgin. In February 2015, Guerrero was cast as the female lead in CBS' television pilot for Super Clyde, but the show was not picked up for series. In 2017, Guerrero was cast in a regular role for season 2 of Superior Donuts. Guerrero has appeared in the films Emoticon ;), Peter and John, and Happy Yummy Chicken. In 2018, she appeared in the films Beyond Control and The Godmother.

In 2016, Guerrero released In the Country We Love: My Family Divided, a memoir about her parents being detained and deported when she was 14. The book was written with Michelle Burford and published by Henry Holt and Co. A drama based on her memoir was picked up by CBS, to be developed into a drama executive produced by Jennie Snyder Urman, Ben Silverman, and Paul Sciarrotta, with Snyder attached as the showrunner. Guerrero was initially set to play the lead. In 2017, CBS decided to pass on the project, but was picked up by Fox. As of January 2018, no pilot for the series has been ordered.

Following the release of In the Country We Love: My Family Divided, Guerrero also released My Family Divided, a memoir similar to her previous work but for younger children. One of the main reasons she wanted to cater this book to a younger audience is because she felt like kids who were in similar situations as her own had no knowledge on how to deal with it. In an interview with The Washington Post, she says "I never read anything close to my story. I had no reference point. I felt really alone."

In July 2018, Guerrero joined the cast of the DC Universe series Doom Patrol as Jane. The series debuted in 2019. She is the first actor to play Crazy Jane onscreen

Guerrero hosted the first two seasons of the Hello Sunshine podcast, How It Is.

Guerrero provided the voice of Isabela Madrigal in the Disney animated film Encanto, which premiered November 24, 2021.

Awards 
In 2018, Guerrero was awarded the "Lupe Ontiveros Indomitable Spirit Award" by the National Hispanic Media Coalition for her commitment to advocacy and increasing the visibility of the Latino community’s achievements and contributions in the USA.

Advocacy 

After publicly speaking about her immigrant parents in an article for the Los Angeles Times, Guerrero became an advocate for the immigrant community. She volunteers and is an ambassador for the Immigration Legal Resource Center, a nonprofit organization, that aims to educate people about issues in the immigrant community. She also became a board member for Mi Familia Vote, a national nonprofit organization that seeks to engage communities for social justice.

In September 2015, she was named one of the Presidential Ambassadors for Citizenship and Naturalization by Barack Obama. On May 24, 2018, she was recognized at the 2018 Phillip Burton Immigration & Civil Rights Awards for the work she continues to do.

Filmography

Film

Television

Discography

Charted songs

Notes

References

External links
 
 In the Country We Love: My Family Divided

1986 births
21st-century American actresses
Actresses from Boston
Actresses from New Jersey
Female models from New Jersey
American film actresses
American models
American people of Colombian descent
American television actresses
Hispanic and Latino American actresses
Hispanic and Latino American models
Living people
People from Jamaica Plain
People from Roxbury, Boston